William Zachary Fields (born July 30, 1984) is an American politician serving as a Democratic member of the Alaska Legislature representing the State's 20th House district.

Career
Fields won the election on 6 November 2018 from the platform of Democratic Party. He secured sixty-six percent of the vote while his closest rival Republican Ceezar Martinson secured twenty-nine percent.

References

1984 births
21st-century American politicians
Living people
Democratic Party members of the Alaska House of Representatives
Politicians from Anchorage, Alaska